Legislative elections were held in Åland on 20 October 2019, alongside elections for municipal councils.

Electoral system
The 30 members of the Parliament of Åland were elected by proportional representation, with seats allocated using the d'Hondt method.

Results

References

External links
Ålandic Electoral Commission

Elections in Åland
Aland
Ålandic legislative election